Tomi Swick is a Canadian singer-songwriter from Hamilton, Ontario formerly signed to Warner Music Canada, now signed to Slaight Music.

By age 13, Swick had learned to play several instruments, including the bagpipes, military drums, piano and guitar. At age 19 he began playing in a Hamilton band but soon pursued a solo career. He is a graduate of Cathedral High School. In February 2006, Swick's song "A Night Like This" was released as the first single from the compilation album From the Heart.  The single became a top-five radio hit in Canada.

In 2006, Swick released his debut album, Stalled Out in the Doorway, which entered the chart at number 77.  The singles "Everything Is Alright" and "Sorry Again" received moderate video play on Much Music and MuchMoreMusic. At the 2007 Juno Awards, Swick was awarded New Artist of the Year.

From January 1, 2007, to February 26, 2007, Swick toured with the Barenaked Ladies on their BLAM tour.

Swick also contributed to two songs on the album 68 by Year of the Monkey. He wrote and performed on the song "Leaving You Behind" and covered John Lennon's "Dear Prudence".

His second album was released on March 27, 2012.

His third album, The Yukon Motel, was released on October 16, 2016, on Slaight Music.

Albums
 2006: Stalled Out in the Doorway
 2010: Tomi Swick
 2016: The Yukon Motel

Singles
"A Night Like This"
"Everything Is Alright"
"Sorry Again"
"Easy Company"

References

External links
 Tomi Swick official site
 Tomi Swick at CBC Radio 3

Canadian pop singers
Canadian male singers
Canadian rock guitarists
Canadian male guitarists
Living people
Canadian male singer-songwriters
Canadian singer-songwriters
Musicians from Hamilton, Ontario
Juno Award for Breakthrough Artist of the Year winners
Year of birth missing (living people)